Maria João Mira (born 18 September 1959 in Lisbon) is a Portuguese screenwriter who authored several successful telenovelas.

Biography
Mira was the first director of the Casa da Criação (House of Creation), a television writing company founded in 2001 by the production company Nicolau Breyner Produções. Her son, André Ramalho, is also a screenwriter. They have been working together on some occasions.

Television
 Sonhos Traídos (2002)
 Saber Amar (2003)
 O Teu Olhar (2003–2004)
 Queridas Feras (2003–2004)
 Morangos com Açúcar (2003–2005)
 Mistura Fina (2004–2005)
 Fala-me de Amor (2006)
 Ilha dos Amores (2007)
 Flor do Mar (2008–2009)
 Anjo Meu (2011–2012)
 Doida Por Ti (2012–2013)
 A Única Mulher (2015-2017)
 A Herdeira (2017-2018)

External links
 
 Photo portrait of Maria João Mira

Portuguese screenwriters
1959 births
Living people